David Elkana Ivry (born 1934) is a Major General (retired) in the Israeli Defense Forces (IDF). He was the Israeli Ambassador to the United States from 2000 to 2002, and the ninth commander of the Israeli Air Force (IAF). In 1999, he was appointed first director of the Israeli National Security Council. From 2003 to 2021, he served as the Vice President of Boeing International and president of Boeing Israel.

Biography
David Ivry was born in Tel Aviv, to Abraham and Shoshana Kruiz In 1952 he was recruited to the Israeli Air Force to flight course No. 14, where he served as a pilot of a P-51 Mustang. Following the Czech-Egyptian arms deal, he decided to continue his service in the IAF. 

In 1956 he was sent to a special flight-instructors course in the UK, and became an instructor in the IAF's academy in Tel Nof Airbase. During the Sinai Campaign he served as an Ouragan pilot. In 1957 he was appointed as deputy commander of the 113th squadron. In 1959 he ejected from his Dassault Super Mystère during an engagement with an Egyptian Mig-17. 

In 1960 he was appointed as commander of the basic squadron at the IAF academy, and in 1961 he was a member of the IAF delegation to France to onboard the IAF's Mirage III fighters. 

In 1962, he became the deputy commander of the first Israeli squadron of the French Dassault Mirage. In 1963 he was appointed as commander of the 109th Mystere squadron, and in 1964 he became commander of the 117th squadron, the first jet squadron in the IAF. In 1966 he became commander of the IAF academy and its first commander after the move from Tel Nof base to Hazerim base.  

In the Six-Day War, Ivry served as a Mirage pilot and the commander of the Mystère squadron. In October 1968 he became head of the Air Division 3 and in 1969 was promoted to Colonel. In 1970 he became commander of the Tel Nof base. In 1977 he was promoted to Major General and from October 1977 to December 1982, he served as the ninth commander of the IAF. While he was in command, the IAI bases were moved from Sinai to the Negev, the air force took part in Operation Litani and Operation Opera. He was in command of Operation Mole Cricket 19 in the early stages of the 1982 Lebanon War.

In 1982 he left the service and became Chairman of the Israeli Aerospace Industry (IAI) for a short period. In 1983 he returned to service and become deputy Head of the General Staff and Head of the IDFs Operations Division. in 1985 he was appointed again as Chairman of the IAI and during 1986-1996 was the Director General of the Ministry of Defense. He served as head of the Israeli National Security Counsel between March 1999 - January 2000, and was appointed as Israel's ambassador to the US during 2000-2002. 

On September 2, 2003, Boeing named Ivry as vice president of Boeing International and president of Boeing Israel. He represents the company’s business interests and coordinates companywide business activities in Israel. He retired in 2021 and was succeeded by Ido Nehoshtan, who also served as the commander of the Israeli Air Force (2008-2012).

Ivry resides in Ramat Hasharon, and is married with 3 children. His son, Gil Ivry, was an F-16 pilot who died in a training accident in 1987. In 2008 he was awarded honorary member of his home town, Ramat Hasharon.

References

1934 births
Living people
Israeli Jews
Israeli Air Force generals
Israeli aviators
Six-Day War pilots
Jews in Mandatory Palestine
Ambassadors of Israel to the United States
People from Tel Aviv